Above Ground was a band from Christchurch, New Zealand formed in 1983.

History
Above Ground developed out of the friendship of the four members: Bill Direen (Guitar/Vocals), Carol Woodward (Keyboards), Maryrose Wilkinson (Bass/Vocals) and Stuart Page (Drums). The group played locally and at the Punakaiki Music Festival (West Coast, New Zealand); and would have been forgotten like a lot of bands had Page not recorded nearly every practice and concert and organised the "Gone AIWA" cassette (1983), re-released in 2011 on vinyl by Siltbreeze. Historian of NZ music, John Dix, mentions the group in his encyclopaedia of NZ Rock and Roll Stranded in Paradise.

Cassette
Gone AIWA (1983)

Album
Black vinyl 12" 33 1/3 album was released by Siltbreeze Records, Philadelphia, USA, (from cassette of 1983). 2011.

References

External links
[URL = http://south.indies.online.fr]

New Zealand indie rock groups
Musical groups established in 1983